New York’s 24th congressional district is located in Upstate New York, stretching alongside Lake Ontario from near Buffalo in the west to Watertown in the east. The district does not include Rochester, which is in the 25th district. Since 2023, it has been represented by Claudia Tenney. In the 2022 election it voted more strongly Republican than any other district in the state. Prior to the redistricting which took effect in 2023, the district included the city of Syracuse.

Voting 
Results under current lines (since 2023)

History

1869–1873: All of Cayuga, Seneca, Wayne counties
1919–1945: Parts of Bronx and Westchester counties
1945–1971: Parts of Bronx county
1971–1973: Parts of Bronx and Westchester counties
1973–1983: Parts of Westchester county
1983–1993: All of Columbia, Greene, Saratoga, Warren and Washington counties; parts of Dutchess and Rensselaer counties
1993–2003: All of Clinton, Franklin, Fulton, Hamilton, Jefferson, Lewis, Oswego and St. Lawrence counties; parts of Essex and Herkimer counties
2003–2013: All of Chenango, Cortland, Herkimer and Seneca counties; parts of Broome, Cayuga, Oneida, Ontario, Otsego, Tioga and Tompkins counties

2013–2023
All of Cayuga, Onondaga and Wayne counties; part of Oswego county

From 2013 to 2023, the district included all of Cayuga, Onondaga, and Wayne counties, and the western part of Oswego County. Its largest city was Syracuse, and it as a swing district.

This district was represented by Republican John Katko from 2015 to 2023. In the 117th United States Congress, it was one of very few Democratic-leaning districts in the country to be represented by a Republican, and one of only nine districts that voted for Joe Biden in the 2020 presidential election while being held or won by a Republican. Katko had also won re-election in 2016 while the district was carried by Democrat Hillary Clinton.

List of members representing the district

Election results 

In 2008, Michael Arcuri won the election with 130,799 votes (9,454 from Working Families Party line) to Richard L. Hanna's 120,880 out of 282,114 total votes. Note that in New York State electoral politics there are several minor parties at various points on the political spectrum. Certain parties will invariably endorse either the Republican or Democratic candidate for every office, hence the state electoral results contain both the party votes, and the final candidate votes (Listed as "Recap").

Historical district boundaries

See also

List of United States congressional districts
New York's congressional districts
United States congressional delegations from New York

References 

 Congressional Biographical Directory of the United States 1774–present
 2004 House election data Clerk of the House of Representatives
 2002 House election data "
 2000 House election data "
 1998 House election data "
 1996 House election data "
 1984 House election data "

24
Broome County, New York
Cayuga County, New York
Chenango County, New York
Cortland County, New York
Herkimer County, New York
Oneida County, New York
Ontario County, New York
Otsego County, New York
Seneca County, New York
Tioga County, New York
Tompkins County, New York
Constituencies established in 1823
1823 establishments in New York (state)